An automatic ballot referral (or compulsory referral)  is a type of referendum that is legally required to automatically be placed on a ballot. In the United States, many states have laws in their constitution requiring a question to hold a constitutional convention to appear before the voters after a scheduled amount of time.

Types

Constitutional Convention 
In the United States, fourteen states' constitutions state that they must give voters a chance to decide if they want to amend the constitution at set times.

Notes

References 

Ballot measures